Bakary Jarjue (born 3 June 1949) is a Gambian sprinter. He competed in the men's 100 metres at the 1984 Summer Olympics.

References

1949 births
Living people
Athletes (track and field) at the 1984 Summer Olympics
Gambian male sprinters
Olympic athletes of the Gambia
Athletes (track and field) at the 1978 Commonwealth Games
Athletes (track and field) at the 1982 Commonwealth Games
Commonwealth Games competitors for the Gambia
Place of birth missing (living people)